"Someplace Far Away (Careful What You're Dreaming)" is a song written and recorded by American country music artist Hal Ketchum. It was released in September 1993 as the fourth and final single from his album Sure Love. The song reached number 24 on the Billboard Hot Country Singles & Tracks chart but it peaked at number 6 on the Canadian RPM Country Tracks.

Chart performance
"Someplace Far Away (Careful What You're Dreaming)" debuted on the U.S. Billboard Hot Country Singles & Tracks for the week of September 18, 1993.

References

1993 singles
Hal Ketchum songs
Songs written by Hal Ketchum
Song recordings produced by Allen Reynolds
Curb Records singles
1992 songs